Gustavo Oscar Carrara (born 24 May 1973) is a prelate of the Roman Catholic Church. He has served as an auxiliary bishop of Buenos Aires since 2017.

Life 
Born in Buenos Aires, Carrara was ordained to the priesthood on 24 October 1998 by Jorge Mario Bergoglio, archbishop of Buenos Aires, the future Pope Francis.

On 20 November 2017 he was appointed auxiliary bishop of Buenos Aires and titular bishop of Thasbalta. Carrara received his episcopal consecration on 16 December from Mario Aurelio Poli, archbishop of Buenos Aires, with bishop of San Isidro, Óscar Vicente Ojea Quintana, titular archbishop and rector of the Pontifical Catholic University of Argentina, Víctor Manuel Fernández, auxiliary  bishop of Buenos Aires, Joaquín Mariano Sucunza, and auxiliary  bishop of Buenos Aires, Ernesto Giobando, serving as co-consecrators.

See also
 Catholic Church in Argentina

References

External links 
 Bishop Gustavo Oscar Carrara on Catholic-Hierarchy.org  

1973 births
Living people
21st-century Roman Catholic bishops in Argentina
People from Buenos Aires
Roman Catholic bishops of Buenos Aires